The Durham County Justice Center is a civic building in downtown Durham, North Carolina.  The $120 million building opened to the public in February 2013.  The building houses the Durham County Sheriff's Office, the Durham County District Attorney's Office, and has 20 courtrooms.  The building is 318,533 square feet and was built to LEED Gold Standards. The Justice Center was built with sustainable materials and includes lawns on its roofs for insulation and to capture runoff.  It is one of the tallest buildings in Durham and dominates the downtown skyline from NC 147.

References

External links 
  Durham County Courthouse
  Durham County Sheriff's Office
  Durham County District Attorney's Office

Buildings and structures in Durham, North Carolina
Government buildings completed in 2013
Skyscrapers in Durham, North Carolina
Skyscraper office buildings in North Carolina